1-Octanethiol, also called 1-mercaptooctane, is an organic compound.

The National Institute for Occupational Safety and Health in the United States considers this compound to be an occupational hazard. Exposure to this compound can affect the eyes, skin, respiratory system, blood, and central nervous system, and lead to irritation to the eyes, skin, nose, and throat; lassitude; cyanosis; increased respiration; nausea; drowsiness; headache; and vomiting.

References 

Alkanethiols
Foul-smelling chemicals